The Superior National Forest Scenic Byway (SNFSB), also known as Forest Highway 11, is a combination of state and county highways in Minnesota that travel between the historic communities of the Iron Range and Lake Superior's North Shore. The route was given State Scenic Byway status in 1999.

Route description
The byway begins in Gilbert, at the intersection of State Highway 37 (MN 37) and Sparta Road. The route follows MN 37 to MN 135, continuing eastward along the latter through Biwabik and then to Aurora, where it leaves MN 135 and follows County Road 100 (CR 100) to the center of town. From there it turns south until the city border, and then resumes its eastward travel along CR 110 to Hoyt Lakes. From Hoyt Lakes the road gradually arcs southward. This portion is also called Skibo Lookout Road, after the Skibo Vista Scenic Overlook, which overlooks the Laurentian Divide. CR 110 ends at its junction with CR 16 (Town Line Road), and the byway route again continues east, through the unincorporated towns of Fairbanks and Basset. Crossing the St. Louis–Lake county line, the roadway becomes CR 15 and passes through Toimi. It then travels east along CR 5 into Silver Bay, ending at MN 61 near the North Shore.

History
The byway was established in 1999, traveling  from Aurora to Silver Bay. The route was extended in 2014 to Gilbert.

Major intersections

See also 
 North Shore Scenic Drive
 Gunflint Trail

Notes

References

External links 

Map on Google My Maps

Transportation in St. Louis County, Minnesota
Transportation in Lake County, Minnesota
Scenic highways in the United States